Phú Mỹ is a township (thị trấn) and town of the Phú Tân District of An Giang Province, Vietnam.

Communes of An Giang province
Populated places in An Giang province
District capitals in Vietnam
Townships in Vietnam